Stefan Ilsanker (born 6 July 1965 in Berchtesgaden, Bavaria) is a German luger who competed for West Germany from the late 1980s to the early 1990s. He won the silver medal in the men's doubles event at the 1987 FIL World Luge Championships in Igls, Austria.

Ilsanker also won a silver medal in the mixed team event at the 1990 FIL European Luge Championships in Igls. He also finished fourth in the men's doubles event at the 1988 Winter Olympics in Calgary.

Ilsanker's best overall Luge World Cup finish was second twice in men's doubles (1986-7, 1987-8).

References
1988 luge men's doubles results
Hickok sports information on World champions in luge and skeleton.
List of European luge champions 
List of men's doubles luge World Cup champions since 1978.

External links
 

German male lugers
Living people
People from Berchtesgaden
Sportspeople from Upper Bavaria
Lugers at the 1988 Winter Olympics
1965 births
20th-century German people